Darina Ryashidovna Valitova (born 9 February 1997) is a Russian competitor in Solo and Mixed Duet synchronized swimming. Together with Aleksandr Maltsev, she won a gold medal in the inaugural mixed duet competition at the 2015 World Championships.

Career
Valitova has been member of the Russian national team since 2007. In 2008, she took the 3rd place in duo combination at the Moscow Championships. She became multiple junior champion of Russia in duo and group from 2009-2011. In 2012, she won gold in duo combination in Somen, Spain. At the 2013 European Junior Championships in Poznan, Poland, Valitova won 3 gold medals in Duet, Free Routine Combination and Team competition.

In 2014, Valitova began competing as a Senior, and she was a member of the Russian Team that won gold at the 2014 European Championships. In November 2014, FINA officially approved of adding mixed-gender events in Synchronized swimming and diving under its banner after a vote at the Extraordinary Congress in Doha Qatar. Valitova began pairing up with Aleksandr Maltsev. They competed at the Italian Open Test for mixed duet where they took the gold medal.

At the 2015 World Aquatics Championships in Kazan, Valitova/Maltsev represented Russia at the inaugural Mixed Duet in synchronized swimming, after leading the preliminaries in Mixed Duet technical, they finished second in the finals losing just 0.2122 points to Americans Bill May and Christina Jones. They avenged their loss by winning the gold in Mixed Duet free with a score of 91.7333 points ahead of Lum/May.

References

External links
Darina Valitova 
Darina Valitova Sports bio

1997 births
Living people
Russian synchronized swimmers
World Aquatics Championships medalists in synchronised swimming
Synchronized swimmers at the 2015 World Aquatics Championships
Synchronized swimmers at the 2017 World Aquatics Championships
European Aquatics Championships medalists in synchronised swimming
Swimmers from Moscow